Captain Kunwar Awadhesh Pratap Singh (born October 1888, Rampur Baghelan–died 16 June 1967, Kanpur) was an Indian politician and Indian independence activist.

He was a member of the Indian National Congress party in Madhya Pradesh. He was a member of the Indian Constituent Assembly, the Provisional Parliament and the Rajya Sabha between 1952 and 1960. He became the Prime Minister of Rewa State in 1948 and the Chief Minister of Vindhya Pradesh from 1948 to 14 April 1949.

Singh was married to Maharaj Kumari and they had one son and one daughter. His son, Govind Narayan Singh, became the Chief Minister of Madhya Pradesh.

He died on 16 June 1967 in Kanpur. The Awadhesh Pratap Singh University in Rewa was named in his honour.

References

Indian independence activists from Madhya Pradesh
People from Satna district
1888 births
1967 deaths
Members of the Constituent Assembly of India
Rajya Sabha members from Madhya Pradesh
Vindhya Pradesh MLAs 1951–1956
Vindhya Pradesh politicians
Indian National Congress politicians
Chief ministers from Indian National Congress
Indian National Congress politicians from Madhya Pradesh